(born 24 May 1959) is a Paralympian athlete from Japan competing mainly in category T52 sprint events.

She competed in the 1996 Summer Paralympics in Atlanta, United States.  There she won a gold medal in the women's 800 metres - T51 event, finished sixth in the women's 200 metres - T51 event and finished sixth in the women's 400 metres - T51 event.  She also competed at the 2000 Summer Paralympics in Sydney, Australia. There she won a silver medal in the women's 200 metres - T52 event, a silver medal in the women's 800 metres - T52 event and a silver medal in the women's 1500 metres - T52 event.  She also competed at the 2008 Summer Paralympics in Beijing, China.    There she won a bronze medal in the women's 100 metres - T52 event and finished fourth in the women's 200 metres - T52 event

External links
 

Paralympic athletes of Japan
Athletes (track and field) at the 1996 Summer Paralympics
Athletes (track and field) at the 2000 Summer Paralympics
Athletes (track and field) at the 2008 Summer Paralympics
Athletes (track and field) at the 2012 Summer Paralympics
Paralympic gold medalists for Japan
Paralympic silver medalists for Japan
Paralympic bronze medalists for Japan
Living people
1959 births
Medalists at the 1996 Summer Paralympics
Medalists at the 2000 Summer Paralympics
Medalists at the 2008 Summer Paralympics
Paralympic medalists in athletics (track and field)
Japanese female wheelchair racers
20th-century Japanese women
21st-century Japanese women